Serhiy Leonidovych Fesenko (Сергей Леонидович Фесенко, born 29 January 1959) is a Soviet swimmer and Olympic champion. He competed at the 1980 Olympic Games in Moscow, where he won the gold medal in 200 m butterfly.

He graduated from Kiev University of Physical Education. He competed for the "Avangard" Club (Kiev). Honored Master of Sports of USSR (1978). Champion 1980 Olympic Games in 200 m butterfly (1.59,76). Silver medalist of the Olympic Games 1980 in 400 meter individual medley (4.23,43). Silver medalist at 1978 World Swimming Championships and 1982 FINA World Swimming Championships in 200 meters butterfly. Bronze in 1982 FINA World Swimming Championships in 400 meter individual medley. 1977 and 1981 European Championship champion in 400 meter individual medley. Silver medalist of the 1983 European Championship in 200 m butterfly. Bronze medalist of the 1981 European Championship in 200 meter butterfly. The winner of the competition at the European Cup 1979, 1981 in the 200 meter butterfly, 1982 in 400 meter medley. The winner of the World Universiade 1981 and 1983 in the 200 meter butterfly, 1981 in 200 and 400 meter individual medley. USSR Championship 1977, 1978, 1979, 1980, 1981, 1982, 1983.

Sergey has married his schoolmate Iryna Fesenko in 1980. They have two sons, Serhiy Fesenko Jr. (born in 1982) and Kyrylo Fesenko (born in 1986). Both are swimmers.

Iryna is an interior, home, and landscape designer.

Serhiy Jr. competed in the 2000 Olympic Games in Sydney, Australia, 2004 Olympic Games in Athens, Greece and qualified for 2008 Olympic Games in Beijing, China for Ukraine. He is an alumnus Indiana University. Serhiy became a Big Ten swimmer of the week twice and once an NCAA swimmer of the week in 2005-2006 collegiate season.

Kyrylo competed at 2006 European Championships in Budapest and 2008 European Championships in Eindhoven. He's a student at Drury University, and NCAA D2 individual and team champion for 2006–2007, 2007–2008 and 2008-2009 collegiate seasons.

References

External links

YouTube heat 400 IM Olympic Games -80
YouTube heat 200 m butterfly Olympic Games -80

1959 births
Living people
Ukrainian male butterfly swimmers
Soviet male medley swimmers
Soviet male butterfly swimmers
Olympic swimmers of the Soviet Union
Swimmers at the 1980 Summer Olympics
Olympic gold medalists for the Soviet Union
Olympic silver medalists for the Soviet Union
Sportspeople from Kryvyi Rih
Ukrainian male medley swimmers
World Aquatics Championships medalists in swimming
European Aquatics Championships medalists in swimming
Medalists at the 1980 Summer Olympics
Olympic gold medalists in swimming
Olympic silver medalists in swimming
Universiade medalists in swimming
Universiade gold medalists for the Soviet Union